Paris After Dark is a 1943 American war drama film directed by Léonide Moguy and starring George Sanders, Philip Dorn and Brenda Marshall. It portrays the activities of the French resistance in occupied Paris during World War II. The portrayal of the resistance was modeled on the Communist-led Front National, possibly due to the influence of screenwriter Harold Buchman who was known for his left-wing views.

The film's sets were designed by art directors James Basevi and John Ewing.

Partial cast

References

Bibliography
 Dick, Bernard F. The Star-spangled Screen: The American World War II Film. University Press of Kentucky, 1996. 
 McLaughlin, Robert and Parry, Sally. We'll Always Have the Movies: American Cinema during World War II. University Press of Kentucky, 2006.

External links

1943 films
American war drama films
American black-and-white films
1940s war drama films
1940s English-language films
Films directed by Léonide Moguy
20th Century Fox films
Films set in Paris
World War II films made in wartime
Films scored by Hugo Friedhofer
1943 drama films